is a professional Japanese baseball player. He plays pitcher for the Yomiuri Giants.

On October 10, 2018, he was selected Japan national baseball team at the 2018 MLB Japan All-Star Series.

References

External links

 NPB.com

1992 births
Baseball people from Saitama Prefecture
Living people
Japanese baseball players
Nippon Professional Baseball pitchers
Tohoku Rakuten Golden Eagles players
Yomiuri Giants players
Waseda University alumni
People from Kawagoe, Saitama